The 1948 Paisley by-election was a parliamentary by-election held on 18 February 1948 for the British House of Commons constituency of Paisley in Scotland.  it was indirectly caused by the death of former Conservative Prime Minister Stanley Baldwin which had the effect of elevating his son, the sitting Labour MP Oliver Baldwin, to become Earl Baldwin of Bewdley.

The election was a straight fight between Douglas Johnston for Labour and John MacCormick, a Scottish nationalist candidate with the support of the Conservative Party and the Liberal Party, with Johnston emerging the winner by 6,545 votes: Johnston received 27,213 votes to  McCormick's 20,668.

References

By-elections to the Parliament of the United Kingdom in Scottish constituencies
Paisley by-election
Paisley by-election
Paisley by-election, 1948
Politics of Renfrewshire
Paisley by-election